A central vowel, formerly also known as a mixed vowel, is any in a class of vowel sound used in some spoken languages. The defining characteristic of a central vowel is that the tongue is positioned halfway between a front vowel and a back vowel. (In practice, unrounded central vowels tend to be further forward and rounded central vowels further back.)

List
The central vowels that have dedicated symbols in the International Phonetic Alphabet are:

 close central unrounded vowel 
 close central protruded vowel 
 close-mid central unrounded vowel  (older publications may use )
 close-mid central rounded vowel  (older publications may use )
 mid central vowel with ambiguous rounding 
 open-mid central unrounded vowel  (older publications may use )
 open-mid central rounded vowel  (older publications may use )

There also are central vowels that don't have dedicated symbols in the IPA:
 close central compressed vowel 
 near-close central compressed vowel 
 mid central compressed vowel 
 open central unrounded vowel  (commonly written  as if it were front)
 open central rounded vowel

See also
Front vowel
Back vowel
List of phonetics topics
Relative articulation

Bibliography

 

Vowels by backness